The Unity and Progress Party (PUP) is a political party in Guinea. It was the ruling party during the long rule of President Lansana Conté. In terms of ideology, the PUP advocates the unity of Guineans and economic liberalism.

In the parliamentary election held on 30 June 2002, the party won 61.57% of the popular vote and 85 out of 114 seats. Its candidate in the 21 December 2003 presidential election, Lansana Conté, won 95.25% of the vote; this election was, however, generally boycotted by the opposition.

Following Conté's death on December 22, 2008, the military immediately seized power in a coup d'état, ending the rule of the PUP. The party has continued to exist since the coup, although in a severely weakened form. It nominated Aboubacar Somparé, a prominent figure in the Conté regime and the man who would have been the constitutional successor to Conté had the military not intervened, as its candidate for the June 2010 presidential election, but he received only about 1% of the vote.

Electoral history

Presidential elections

National Assembly elections

References 

Political parties in Guinea